Gary and Garry are English language masculine given names.

Etymology
Gary is likely derived from the Norman French name Geiree, itself descended from the Old Frankish name Geiserich, composed of two elements: “*gaizaz” (spear, pike, javelin) plus “*rīkijaz” (kingly, royal).

A variant form of Gary is Garry, the spelling of which has been influenced by that of Barry. An informal pet form of Gary is Gaz, a variant of which is Gazza.

A given name associated with Gary and Garry is Garrison; the latter is sometimes borne by sons of men bearing the former names. The Gaelic Garaidh is also associated with Gary.

Gary is also a popular name in India and is often stylized as Garry or Devanagari गैरी.

Because of the "Gare" sound at the beginning in American English, Gary is sometimes incorrectly thought to be a diminutive of Garrett, however the names are unrelated. Although it is a name in its own right, it can be used as a diminutive of various names, including Garrett, Garrison, or Gareth.

History
The usage of Gary as a given name is intertwined with the success of the actor Gary Cooper (originally Frank Cooper). The American industrialist Elbert Henry Gary left his name to the town of Gary, Indiana. The theatrical agent Nan Collins, who lived in this town, suggested the name Gary to Frank Cooper, one of her clients. Cooper thus adopted the name Gary and enjoyed a successful film career (as Gary Cooper) which caused the name to become popular. The name's popularity was further maintained by the popularity of cricketer Gary Sobers (whose first name was actually a pet form of Garfield), footballer Gary Lineker (b. 1960), and musician Gary Glitter (originally Paul Gadd).

According to the Social Security Administration, Gary was relatively rare as a given name in the 1900-1920s period (e.g., in the 1910s it was the 677th most frequent name, given to less than 0.01% of the babies born in that decade). In the 1930s, 0.38% of the male babies in the United States were named Gary, and in the 1950s as many as 1.54% of the male babies were given this name, making it the 12th most popular given name of that decade.

The name Gary reached its record popularity (9th place) in 1954, the year after Gary Cooper received his Best Actor Academy Award for his leading role in High Noon. Since then, the popularity of Gary as a given name in the United States has been on a very slow, but steady decline. In the 1990s, this name was the 170th most popular, given to around 0.1% of newborn males.

In the United Kingdom, its popularity peaked during the 1960s (it was the 16th most popular male name in 1964) and still ranked as high as 26th in 1984, but by the 1990s had fallen out of the top 100. In 2013, only 28 babies born in England and Wales were named Gary, leading Garys to be labeled a "dying breed".

People

Computer science, engineering, science and medicine
Gary Becker, American economist
Gary Evans, Psychologist and professor of Human Ecology in the Cornell University College of Human Ecology
Gary Fisher, one of the inventors of the modern mountain bike
Gary Kildall, American computer scientist, microcomputer entrepreneur
Gary McKinnon, Scottish systems administrator, hacker
Garry Newman, founder of British video game developer Facepunch Studios

Entertainment

Gary Bautell, American military radio broadcaster
Gary Brolsma, Internet celebrity
Gary Burghoff, American actor
Gary Busey, American actor
Gary Cole, American television and film actor
Gary Coleman (1968–2010), American actor
Gary Collins, American television and film actor
Gary Cooper, American film actor
Gary Dell'Abate, American radio producer, television host
Gary Dourdan, American actor
Gary Farmer, Canadian actor 
Gary LeRoi Gray, American actor
Gary Lucy, British actor
Garry Marshall (1934–2016), American television producer
Garry Moore, American actor and television personality
Gary Oldman, English actor, filmmaker, musician
Gary Ross, American writer, director, actor
Garry Shandling (1949–2016), American actor and comedian 
Gary Sinise, American actor, film director, musician
Gary Waldhorn (1943–2022), English actor
Gary Winick, American film director, producer

Law, military, and community service
Gary Born, international lawyer and academic
Gary L. Francione, American legal scholar
Gary Gordon, American military sniper and Medal of Honor recipient

Literature and the arts
Gary Arndt, American travel photographer
Gary Gygax, American writer and game designer
Gary "Garrison" Keillor, American writer
Gary Larson, American cartoonist
Gary Snyder, American poet
Garry Trudeau, American cartoonist
Gary Younge (born 1969), British journalist, author, broadcaster and academic

Musicians

Gary Barber, English singer songwriter
Gary Barlow, English singer-songwriter
Garry Gary Beers, Australian bassist, INXS
Gary Brooker, English singer, songwriter, pianist
Gary Burton, American jazz vibraphonist
Gary Cherone, American rock singer-songwriter
Gary Clark Jr., American musician
Gary Crosby (born 1955), British jazz double bassist, composer and educator.
Gary Garcia, American musician, songwriter

Gary Green, an American conductor
Gary Green (born 1950), English multi-instrumentalist of Gentle Giant, Three Friends
Gary M. Green, an American musician and entrepreneur
Gary Holt, Thrash metal guitarist, Exodus, Slayer
Gary Kemp, British musician
Garry Koehler, Australian songwriter
Gary Lightbody, Northern Irish musician, songwriter
Gary Lux, Austrian singer (Eurovision 1985 and 1987)
Gary Moore (1952–2011), Northern Irish singer-songwriter and musician
Gary Morris country singer
Gary Numan, English singer, composer, musician
Gary Puckett, American singer, front man for the 1960s group, The Union Gap
Gary Richrath (1949–2015), American rock guitarist, member of REO Speedwagon
Gary Rossington, Guitarist with Lynyrd Skynyrd
Gary Stewart (1944–2003), American country rock singer-songwriter and musician
Gary Thain, New Zealand rock bassist
Gary Valenciano, Filipino actor, singer-songwriter, and television host
Gary Weinrib, Canadian musician, singer-songwriter, lead vocalist, bassist, and keyboardist for the Canadian rock group Rush

Politics
Gary Condit, California congressman who was briefly a murder suspect
Gary Doer, Canadian diplomat and politician
Gary Elkins, American politician from Texas 
Gary Hart, American politician, lawyer, author, professor, commentator
Gary Johnson, American businessman and politician 
Gary Locke, American politician
Garry McCarthy, former superintendent of the Chicago Police Department
Gary Smith, American politician

Sports

Gary Ablett, English footballer and manager
Gary Ablett Jr., Australian rules footballer
Gary Ablett Sr., Australian rules footballer
Gary Alexander, American baseball player
Gary Alexander (born 1969), American basketball player
Gary Alexander, English footballer
Gary Alexander, American martial artist
Gary Alexander, American Olympic wrestler
Gary Anderson, Scottish darts player
Gary Anderson, American football player
Gary Anderson, American football player
Gary Anderson, American football player
Gary Aramist, Israeli Olympic sport shooter
Gary Bailey, English footballer
Gary Baldinger, American football player
Gary Balough, former NASCAR Cup Series driver
Gary Barbaro, American football player
Gary Barnidge, American football player
Gary Bettman, American sports commissioner
Gary Birtles, English football player
Gary Brabham, Australian racing driver and convicted rapist
Gary Brackett, American football player
Gary Breen, Irish footballer
Gary Brightwell (born 1999), American football player
Gary Brown, American football player
Gary Bryant Jr. (born 2001), American football player
Gary Burley, American football player
Gary Cahill, English footballer
Gary Campbell, American football player
Gary Carter, American baseball player
Gary Clark, American football player
Gary Cohen, American baseball commentator
Garry Cobb, American football player
Gary Collins, American football player
Gary Cunningham (born 1940 or 1941), American basketball coach and athletic director
Gary Cuozzo, American football player
Gary Danielson, American football player
Gary Dunn, American football player
Gary Fencik, American football player
Gary Garrison, American football player
Gary Gillespie, Scottish football player
Garry Gilliam, American football player
Gary Greaves, American football player
Gary Green, American football player
Gary Green , American baseball player
Gary Green, American businessman and minor-league baseball team owner
Gary Green, Canadian ice hockey player
Gary Gussman, American football player
Gary Hall, Jr., American swimmer
Gary Hocking, Rhodesian motorcycle racer
Gary Hogeboom, American football player
Gary Holt, a Scottish footballer
Gary Holt, a Canadian ice hockey player
Gary Hughes, HGV Driver and FA Coach
Gary Jennings Jr. (born 1997), American football player
Gary Jeter, American football player
Gary "Big Hands" Johnson, American football player
Garry Kallos (born 1956), Canadian wrestler and sambo competitor
Garry Kasparov, Russian chess grand master and former world champion
Gary Kelly, Northern Irish international indoor and lawn bowler
Gary Kelly, British football goalkeeper
Gary Kelly, Irish footballer who played for Leeds United
Gary Knafelc, American football player
Gary Kubiak, American football player and coach
Gary Lane, American football player and referee
Gary Larsen, American football player
Gary Lineker, English footballer
Gary Maloncon, American basketball player
Gary Marangi, American football player
Gary McSheffrey, English footballer
Gary Medel, Chilean football player
Gary Moeller, American football coach
Gary Naysmith, Scottish footballer
Gary Neville, English footballer
Gary O'Neil (born 1983), English former professional footballer
Garry O'Neill (born 1974), Australian martial artist
Gary O'Neill (born 1982), Irish footballer who played for Shelbourne in the 2000s
Gary O'Neill (born 1995) Irish footballer who, as of 2022, plays for Shamrock Rovers
Gary Paffett, English racing driver
Gary Parris, American football player
Gary Payton, American basketball player
Gary Player, South African golfer
Gary Plummer, American football player
Garry Ringrose, Irish rugby union player
Gary Robinson, Canadian football player
Gary Sheffield, American baseball player
Gary Spani, American football player
Gary Speed, Welsh footballer and manager
Gary M. Stevens, English footballer
Gary Stills, American football player
Gary Trent Jr., American basketball player
Gary Walker, American football player
Gary Walker, American football player
Gary Wisener, American football player
Gary Zimmerman, American football player

Crime
Gary Evans (1954–1998), American thief and confessed serial killer 
Gary Gilmore, executed American criminal
Gary Glitter, English glam rock singer and convicted child molester
Gary Heidnik, American rapist and killer
Gary Steven Krist, American fugitive
Gary Plauché (1945–2014), American man known for the 1984 vigilante killing of Jeff Doucet
Gary Ridgway, American fugitive

Fictional characters
Gary, a character played Jason Priestley in the 1986 American fantasy drama film The Boy Who Could Fly
Gary, a character from the adult anthology series Love, Death & Robots
Gary Chalmers, a superintendent from the animated sitcom series The Simpsons
Gary Goodspeed, the main character from the animated space opera comedy Final Space
Gary Grooberson, character in the 2021 film Ghostbusters: Afterlife
 Gary Gulliver, the protagonist of Hanna-Barbera's 1968 animated TV series The Adventures Of Gulliver
 Gary Harrison, in the "All About Mormons" episode of South Park
Gary Oak, a researcher and gym leader from the Pokémon video game series
 Gary "Roach" Sanderson, the main protagonist from the video game Call of Duty: Modern Warfare 2
 Gary Smith, from the video game Bully
 Gary "Eggsy" Unwin, the main protagonist of the Kingsman film series 
Gary Windass, a character from the British TV soap opera Coronation Street
Gary the Gadget Guy, a character from the MMO video game Club Penguin
Gary the Snail, SpongeBob's pet snail from the animated series SpongeBob SquarePants

See also
Nathan Lyon (born 1987), Australian cricketer, nicknamed Garry

References

English-language masculine given names
Masculine given names
English masculine given names